Darreh-ye Omid Ali (also Romanized as Darreh-ye Omīd ‘Alī and Darreh Omīd ‘Alī; also Darreh Omīn ‘Alī) is a village in Avarzaman Rural District, Samen District, Malayer County, Hamadan Province, Iran. At the 2006 census, its population was 308, encompassing 70 families.

References 

Populated places in Malayer County